Acontia marmoralis is a moth of the family Noctuidae first described by Johan Christian Fabricius in 1794. It is found in Sri Lanka, India, Japan and Taiwan.

Host plant is Sida rhombifolia, Sida alnifolia and cotton.

References

Moths of Asia
Moths described in 1794
marmoralis